Meredith George Kline (December 15, 1922 – April 14, 2007) was an American theologian and Old Testament scholar. He also had degrees in Assyriology and Egyptology.

Academic career
Kline received his AB from Gordon College, Th.B. and Th.M. from Westminster Theological Seminary in Pennsylvania, and PhD in Assyriology and Egyptology from Dropsie College.  He enjoyed a long and fruitful professorial career spanning five decades and two coasts, teaching Old Testament at Westminster Theological Seminary (1948–77), Gordon-Conwell Theological Seminary (1965–93), the Claremont School of Theology (1974–75), Reformed Theological Seminary (1979–83), and Westminster Seminary California (1981–2002). Kline was a professor emeritus at Westminster Seminary California and Gordon-Conwell until his death. He was an ordained minister in the Orthodox Presbyterian Church.

Work

Building on the legacy of Geerhardus Vos, Kline was an influential voice for covenant theology in the Reformed tradition, providing both new insights into biblical accounts and critical engagement with contemporary biblical scholarship. He is, perhaps, best known for his contributions on the subject of ancient suzerain–vassal treaties, specifically on the relationship of treaties from the 2nd millennium BC to covenants found in the Bible.

Kline is also well known for propounding the framework interpretation of the creation account found in the first chapter of Genesis in the New King James Version.

Theologian John Frame has called Kline "the most impressive biblical theologian of my lifetime," adding that Kline's work "is orthodox, yet often original, and it always provides [a] rich analysis of Scripture."

In 2000, a festschrift was published in Kline's honor: Creator Redeemer Consummator: A Festschrift for Meredith G. Kline, ed. H. Griffith and J. R. Muether (Greenville, SC: Reformed Academic Press), featuring scholars (and former students) such as Tremper Longman and Charles Lee Irons.

Publications
Some of Kline's many publications include:

Books

Articles and chapters

References

External links
Meredith Kline Online – a website with a comprehensive collection of Kline's writings

The Upper Register – a website with publications by and about Kline from his former student and collaborator Lee Irons
Audio lectures by Kline
"Covenant Theology and Old Testament Ethics: Meredith G. Kline's Intrusion Ethics" by Jeong Koo Jeon, in Kerux: The Journal of Northwest Theological Seminary, vol. 16, no. 1
A Glossary of Klinean Terminology
'The Feast of Cover-Over' (JETS 1994)

1922 births
2007 deaths
American Calvinist and Reformed theologians
American biblical scholars
Dropsie College alumni
Gordon College (Massachusetts) alumni
Gordon–Conwell Theological Seminary faculty
Orthodox Presbyterian Church ministers
Westminster Theological Seminary alumni
Westminster Theological Seminary faculty
20th-century American non-fiction writers
21st-century American non-fiction writers
20th-century Calvinist and Reformed theologians
21st-century Calvinist and Reformed theologians
Old Testament scholars
Westminster Seminary California faculty
20th-century American clergy